Soracucho (possibly from Aymara sura dry jiquima, a species of Pachyrhizus, k'uchu, q'uch'u corner, "sura corner") is a mountain in the Vilcanota mountain range in the Andes of Peru, about  high. It is in the Cusco Region, Canchis Province, San Pablo District. Soracucho lies southwest of Collpacucho and south of Yurac Uno Cunca. The Pumanuta River, an important tributary of the Vilcanota River, flows along its northern slope.

References

Mountains of Cusco Region
Mountains of Peru